The 1994–95 YUBA League was the third season of the YUBA League, the top-tier professional basketball league in Yugoslavia (later renamed to Serbia and Montenegro).

Teams 
A total of 32 teams participated in the 1994–95 YUBA League.

Venues and locations

Personnel and sponsorship

Regular season 
A total of 32 teams participated in the regular season, divided into four groups with 8 clubs. It started on 22 October 1994 and ended in on 24 December 1994.

Group One

Group Two

Group Three

Group Four

Championship League

Playoffs

Bracket

Semifinals 

|}

Finals 
Source

|}

Final standings

Clubs in European competitions
Following the adoption of economic sanctions by the international community against FR Yugoslavia, clubs were banned to compete in the European professional club basketball system.

See also 
 1994–95 ACB season
 1994–95 Slovenian Basketball League

References

YUBA